The Ministry of Interior and Defence (MID) was a ministry of the Government of Singapore. It was established in 1965, with Goh Keng Swee as the inaugural minister. The ministry was responsible for both internal and external security, controlling both the police force and the armed forces.

As the differences between the police force and the armed forces became more defined, the ministry was eventually split into the current Ministry of Defence and the Ministry of Home Affairs on 11 August 1970.

Ministers
The ministry was previously headed by the Minister for the Interior and Defence, who was appointed as part of the Cabinet of Singapore.

Legacy 
A legacy of the ministry can be found in the vehicle registration plates of vehicles belonging to the Singapore Armed Forces, bearing "MID".

References

Interior and Defence
Ministries established in 1965
Singapore
Singapore
1965 establishments in Singapore
Ministries disestablished in 1970
1970 disestablishments in Singapore